An election to Dublin City Council took place on 27 June 1991 as part of that year's Irish local elections. 52 councillors were elected from twelve electoral divisions by PR-STV voting for an eight-year term of office.

Results by party

Results by Electoral Area

Artane

Ballyfermot

Cabra

Clontarf

Crumlin

Donaghmede

Drumcondra

Finglas

North Inner City

Pembroke

Rathmines

South Inner City

External links
 https://opac.oireachtas.ie/knowvation/app/consolidatedSearch/#search/v=grid,c=1,q=qs%3D%5Blocal%20elections%5D%2CqueryType%3D%5B16%5D,sm=s,l=library3_lib
 Official website
 irishelectionliterature
 http://irelandelection.com/council.php?elecid=171&tab=constit&detail=yes&electype=5&councilid=7&electype=5

1991 Irish local elections
1991
1990s in Dublin (city)